Eva Pérez (born 18 July 1975) is a Spanish racewalker. She competed in the women's 20 kilometres walk at the 2000 Summer Olympics.

References

External links
 

1975 births
Living people
Athletes (track and field) at the 2000 Summer Olympics
Spanish female racewalkers
Olympic athletes of Spain
Goodwill Games medalists in athletics
Place of birth missing (living people)
Competitors at the 2001 Goodwill Games
20th-century Spanish women
21st-century Spanish women